Yingda Asset Management is a Chinese asset management company founded on 18 July 2012. It was owned by the Central Government of China via subsidiaries of state-owned enterprises.

The company managed some investment funds that open to retail investors to subscribe.

Subsidiaries
 Yingda Capital Management (100%)

Shareholders
 Yingda International Trust (49%)
 China Communications Construction (36%)
 China Aerospace Science & Industry Finance (15%)

References

External links
  
 Official Website of Yingda Capital Management 

Private equity firms of China
Government-owned companies of China
Chinese companies established in 2012